The discography of American country artist Norma Jean consists of twenty studio albums, six compilation albums and thirty-seven singles.

Studio albums

1960s

1970s

2000s

2010s

Collaborations

Compilation albums

Singles

1950s–1960s

1970s

Other singles

Collaborations

Guest singles

B-sides

References 

Country music discographies
Discographies of American artists